Elections to Argyll and Bute Council were held on 3 May 2007 the same day as the other Scottish local government elections and the Scottish Parliament general election. The election was the first one using 11 new wards created as a result of the Local Governance (Scotland) Act 2004, each ward will elect three or four councillors using the single transferable vote system form of proportional representation. The new wards replace 36 single-member wards which used the plurality (first past the post) system of election.

Election result

Ward results

Changes since 2007 Election
†In September 2007, Oban South and the Isles Cllr Mary-Jean Devon quit the Liberal Democrats and became an Independent. She joined the Scottish National Party on 1 July 2011.
††Since the election, Helensburgh Central Cllr James Robb quit the Scottish National Party and became an Independent Nationalist.
†††Since the election, Oban North and Lorn Cllr Neil MacKay quit the Liberal Democrats and became an Alliance of Independent Councillor.
††††On 18 November 2011, Oban South and the Isles Cllr Donald Skye McIntosh died. 
†††††On 25 February 2012 Hellensburgh Central Cllr Al Reay died. 
††††††On 30 March 2012 Dunoon Cllr Alister MacAlister died.

By-Elections since 3 May 2007
On 4 October 2007 the Liberal Democrats Andrew Nisbit won a by-election which arose following the death of former Independent Councillor Ronald Kinloch on 23 July 2007

On 3 November 2011 the SNP's Louise Glen-Lee won a by-election which arose following the death of former SNP Councillor Donald MacDonald on 4 August 2011

References

2007
2007 Scottish local elections